Prince Wilhelm of Wied (German: Wilhelm Friedrich Heinrich Prinz zu Wied, 26 March 1876 – 18 April 1945), reigned briefly as sovereign of the Principality of Albania as Vilhelm I from 7 March to 3 September 1914, when he left for exile. His reign officially came to an end on 31 January 1925, when the country was declared an Albanian Republic.

Outside the country and in diplomatic correspondence, he was styled "sovereign prince", but in Albania, he was referred to as mbret, or king. He was also styled Skanderbeg II, in homage to Skanderbeg, the national hero.

Family and early life

William was born on 26 March 1876 in Neuwied Castle, near Koblenz, in the Prussian Rhineland, as Prince William of Wied. Born into the mediatised house of Wied-Neuwied, he was the third son of William, 5th Prince of Wied (brother of Queen Elisabeth of Romania), and his wife Princess Marie of the Netherlands (sister of Queen Louise of Sweden). He was also second cousin of Wilhelm II, German Emperor.

Prince William served as a Prussian cavalry officer before becoming a captain in the German General Staff in 1911.

Candidate for the Albanian throne
Prince William's aunt, Queen Elisabeth of Romania, on learning that the Great Powers were looking for an aristocrat to rule over Albania, asked Take Ionescu to attempt to persuade them to appoint her nephew to the post.

Eventually the European Great Powers – Austria-Hungary, the United Kingdom of Great Britain and Ireland, the French Third Republic, the German Empire, the Russian Empire and the Kingdom of Italy – selected William, a member of the German princely house of Wied, and related to the Queen of the Netherlands to rule over the newly independent Albania. The announcement was made in November 1913 and the decision was accepted by Ismail Qemali, the head of the provisional government. The offer of the Albanian throne was first made to him in the spring of 1913 but he turned it down. Despite rejecting the offer, the Austrians put pressure on Prince William in an attempt to change his mind. Kaiser Wilhelm was not pleased with the selection of the prince as the king of Albania; considering the choice to be unwise. The Kaiser claimed that he tried to have "a Mohammedan Prince chosen, if possible".

Western Europeans considered Albania to be a poor, lawless and backward country in 1913, and some foreign opinion was scathing. The French press referred to Wilhelm as "le Prince de Vide", meaning "the prince of emptiness"; vide being a pun on his homeland of Wied.

Prince of Albania

On 7 February 1914, William let the Great Powers know that he would accept the throne. On 21 February 1914 a delegation of Albanian notables led by Essad Pasha Toptani and Arbëreshë ones (headed by Luigi Baffa and Vincenzo Baffa Trasci), made a formal request, which he accepted thereby becoming By the grace of the powers and the will of the people the Prince (Mbret) of Albania. One month after accepting the throne on 7 March, he arrived in his provisional capital of Durrës and started to organise his government, appointing Turhan Pasha Përmeti to form the first Albanian cabinet. This first cabinet was dominated by aristocrats (prince Essad Pasha Toptani defence and foreign affairs, prince Gjergj Adhamidhi bej Frashëri finances, prince Aziz Pasha Vrioni agriculture).

His brief reign proved a turbulent one. Immediately following his arrival revolts of Muslims broke out in central Albania against his Chief Minister, Essad Pasha, and against foreign domination that was not Turkish. Greece encouraged the formation of a separatist provisional government in North Epirus. William's position was also undermined by his own officials, notably Essad Pasha himself, who actually accepted money from Italy to finance a revolt and to stage a coup against William. The plot was exposed, Pasha was arrested on 19 May 1914, tried for treason and sentenced to death. Only the intervention of the Italian government saved his life and he escaped to exile in Italy.

The outbreak of World War I presented more problems for Prince William as Austria-Hungary demanded that he send Albanian soldiers to fight alongside them. When he refused, citing the neutrality of Albania in the Treaty of London, the remuneration that he had been receiving was cut off.

Exile and death

Prince William left the country on 3 September 1914 originally heading to Venice. Despite leaving Albania he did so insisting that he remained head of state. In his proclamation he informed the people that "he deemed it necessary to absent himself temporarily."

He returned to Germany and rejoined the Imperial German Army under the pseudonym "Count of Kruja". The name derived from the city of Krujë in Albania. When the Austro-Hungarians forced the Serbian and Montenegrin armies out of Northern Albania in the early months of 1916, William's hopes of being restored were raised although ultimately they came to nothing. After the war, he still harboured ambitions that he might be restored, but the participants at the Paris Peace Conference were unlikely to restore the throne to someone who had just fought against them.

Although several of the factions competing for power in post-war Albania billed themselves as regencies for William, once central authority was definitively restored in 1924, the country was declared a republic on 31 January 1925, officially ending his reign.

With the monarchy in Albania set to be restored with President Ahmet Zogu becoming king, Prince William reaffirmed his claim to the throne announcing he still claimed the throne for himself and his heirs.

Prince William died in Predeal, near Sinaia, in Romania, leaving his son, Hereditary Prince Carol Victor, as heir to his Albanian claims.

Marriage and children
On 30 November 1906 at Waldenburg, Saxony, Prince William married Princess Sophie of Schönburg-Waldenburg (1885–1936); she was distantly related to the Orthodox Ghica family of Albanian origin.  They had two children:
Princess Marie Eleonore (1909–1956) ⚭ Prince Alfred of Schönburg-Waldenburg (1905–1941), son of Prince Heinrich of Schönburg-Waldenburg and Princess Olga of Löwenstein-Wertheim-Freudenberg ⚭ Ion Octavian Bunea (1899–1977)
Hereditary Prince Carol Victor (1913–1973) ⚭ Eileen de Coppet (1922–1985)

Honours

Gallery

Ancestry

In popular culture
Prince Wilhelm is portrayed in the 2008 Albanian film Time of the Comet (based on Ismail Kadare's novel "The dark year" (Viti i mbrapshtë), which takes place during his reign. He is played by the German actor Thomas Heinze.

References

External links

Wilhelm zu Wied:Memorandum on Albania
A listing of Princes of Wied since 1791 and their descendants
 

|-

1876 births
1945 deaths
People from Neuwied
People from the Rhine Province
Members of the Prussian House of Lords
Albanian monarchs
Protestant monarchs
House of Wied-Neuwied
Albanian nobility
German Army personnel of World War I
Grand Crosses of the Order of the Crown (Romania)
Commanders Grand Cross of the Order of the Polar Star
Honorary Knights Grand Cross of the Royal Victorian Order
German emigrants to Albania